Rolando Sergio Etchepare Harismendy (6 October 1929 – 1 July 2004) was a Chilean basketball player. He competed in the men's tournament at the 1956 Summer Olympics.

References

External links

1929 births
2004 deaths
Chilean men's basketball players
1954 FIBA World Championship players
1959 FIBA World Championship players
Olympic basketball players of Chile
Basketball players at the 1956 Summer Olympics
Sportspeople from Concepción, Chile